The second season of Fargo, an American anthology black comedy–crime drama television series created by Noah Hawley, premiered on October 12, 2015, on the basic cable network FX. Its principal cast is Kirsten Dunst, Patrick Wilson, Jesse Plemons, Jean Smart, and Ted Danson. The ten-episode season's finale aired on December 14, 2015. As an anthology, each Fargo season possesses its own self-contained narrative, following a disparate set of characters in various settings.

A prequel to the events in its first season, season two of Fargo takes place in the Upper Midwest in March 1979. It follows the lives of a young couple—Peggy (Dunst) and Ed Blumquist (Plemons)—as they attempt to cover up the hit and run and homicide of Rye Gerhardt (Kieran Culkin), the son of Floyd Gerhardt (Smart), matriarch of the Gerhardt crime family. During this time, Minnesota state trooper Lou Solverson (Wilson), and Rock County sheriff Hank Larsson (Danson), investigate three homicides linked to Rye. 

Cristin Milioti, Brad Garrett, Elizabeth Marvel, Jeffrey Donovan, Rachel Keller, Zahn McClarnon, Angus Sampson, Bokeem Woodbine, and Nick Offerman all make recurring appearances. Kieran Culkin guest stars.

Hawley and his writing team used the second season to expand the scope of the show's storytelling. Season two's episodes were shot in Calgary, Alberta over an 85-day period. The series received widespread critical acclaim and was cited as one of the strongest programs of the 2015 television season. It was a candidate for a multitude of awards, including the Primetime Emmy Award for Outstanding Limited Series and Golden Globe Award for Best Miniseries or Television Film, and won several other honors recognizing outstanding achievement in acting, directing, writing, cinematography, editing, special effects, and creative direction.

Cast

Main
 Kirsten Dunst as Peggy Blumquist, a hairdresser focused on improving herself through self-actualization and pop psychology techniques.
 Patrick Wilson as Lou Solverson, a Minnesota State Patrol trooper and the father of Molly Solverson, one of the main characters of season one. Keith Carradine portrayed the older version of the character in the first season.
 Jesse Plemons as Ed Blumquist, Peggy's husband and the local butcher's assistant.
 Jean Smart as Floyd Gerhardt, wife of Otto Gerhardt, the head of Fargo's most prominent organized crime syndicate. After her husband suffers a debilitating stroke, she finds herself having to lead the Gerhardt dynasty and deal with her three living sons, each of whom is vying to replace their father.
 Ted Danson as Hank Larsson, the sheriff of Rock County, Minnesota, Lou's father-in-law, Betsy's father, and Molly Solverson's maternal grandfather.

Recurring

Special guests
 Kieran Culkin as Rye Gerhardt, the youngest of the three Gerhardt brothers.
 Martin Freeman as Narrator
 Allison Tolman as older Molly Solverson
 Joey King as Greta Grimly, Molly's stepdaughter, reprising her role from season one.
 Colin Hanks as Gus Grimly, Molly's husband, reprising his role from season one.
 Keith Carradine as older Lou Solverson, reprising his role from season one.

Episodes

Production

Development and writing
Details of a new season first emerged in the media following a Television Critics Association (TCA) press event, and by July 21, 2014, FX commissioned ten episodes for Fargo second season.

As an anthology, each season of Fargo is engineered to have a self-contained narrative, following a disparate set of characters in various settings. Noah Hawley and his team of writers used the second season to expand the scope of the show's storytelling—from its narrative to its characters. They increased the show's cast of core characters to five, each with interconnecting arcs and different viewpoints of the central story. Hawley wanted viewers to sympathize with characters they might not feel empathy for in real life. The producers at one point discussed revisiting a modern period for their story. Ultimately, their vision—inspired by Miller's Crossing (1990) and The Man Who Wasn't There (2001), in addition to the show's namesake film (1996)—was realized as a prequel that takes place 27 years before the events of the first season of Fargo (set in 2006) in 1979, rotating between Luverne, Minnesota, Fargo, North Dakota and Sioux Falls, South Dakota. According to Hawley, the change in the time period helped to develop a sense of turbulence and violence in a world that "could not be more fractured and complicated and desperate".

Casting
A principal cast of five actors received star billing in the show's second season. Hawley did not tailor his characters with any specific actors in mind, though Nick Offerman, Brad Garrett, Patrick Wilson and Kirsten Dunst were among the few he considered for starring roles in the season's early stages. The search for talent was sometimes an exhaustive process that required advertising via custom built websites and social media. Once actors were hired, their agents were made aware of the frigid shooting conditions and any issues with the location and potential scheduling conflicts during production were discussed. Hawley discussed the script with actors who had little experience in the television industry. "They're used to reading the whole story but you've given them one or two hours of it," he remarked. Once hired, the actors trained with a dialect coach to master a Minnesota accent.

Dunst and Jesse Plemons were the season's first lead castings (as Peggy and Ed Blumquist) in December 2014. Dunst found out about the project through her agency, and read scripts for two episodes, viewed Fargo first season, and its namesake film, before securing her role. The actress recalled, "I was so impressed by the way it looked, the writing; it was such high-quality television." Plemons came to Hawley's attention for his work in Friday Night Lights (2006–11) and Breaking Bad (2008–13). Hawley thought that the actor's bulky physique, weight he had gained previously for Black Mass (2015), captured the cow-like deportment of his character. Plemons said that he had trouble interpreting his role initially because he "was worried that [being cow-like] meant dumb and just went along with whatever his wife said".

Wilson, Ted Danson, and Jean Smart completed the principal cast by January 2015. Wilson appeared as officer Lou Solverson, Danson as sheriff Hank Larsson, and Smart as Floyd Gerhardt, the matriarch of the Gerhardt crime family. Wilson's casting was unique because he was the only performer to portray an already established character; Keith Carradine played Lou for the show's first season, set 27 years after the events of season two. As such, Hawley did not want to take cues from Carradine because Lou was "at a different point" in his life, although Wilson analyzed Carradine's performance to a point. Wilson was persuaded by Fargo critical accolades and commercial success; the actor said: "There have been several times that you've given your heart and soul to an independent film and more often than not it doesn't match up to any commercial success or people seeing your film. So [my wife and agent] were like, 'You need to do something that people see'." Danson found learning the Minnesota accent difficult; to improve, he began practicing as soon as he was signed, often on set before filming began. Smart's role required an older look, which producers achieved by cutting and dyeing her hair, and Hawley gave the actress a book of paintings by Andrew Wyeth to explain her character.

An ensemble of 20 actors make up the bulk of the series' cast. Hawley found ensembles enticing because they presented "a lot of really good moving pieces". At Paleyfest 2015, the Fargo creator commented: "It's sort of like a horse race in a way, especially when you know that everyone is on this collision course. It's like, 'Who's going to make it?' And you can put people together in unexpected pairings." Offerman played Karl Weathers, an alcoholic and the only lawyer in Luverne, and Cristin Milioti was assigned the part of Betsy Solverson, Lou's terminally ill wife. Hawley felt that Milioti was the right choice because her personality was similar to her character's. Garrett portrays Joe Bulo, and Bokeem Woodbine appears as Mike Milligan, a role he was offered two days after auditioning. For the role of Hanzee Dent, Hawley hired Zahn McClarnon two weeks after his audition. Six others play members of the Gerhardts: Kieran Culkin as Rye, Rachel Keller as Simone, Michael Hogan as Otto, Allan Dobrescu as Charlie, Angus Sampson as Bear, and Jeffrey Donovan as Dodd. When asked about his decision to cast Donovan, Hawley told the actor, "I don't know. You just come off with a sense of power. I think Dodd comes off with a sense of power, and I thought that you have the chops to find the humor in it." Donovan gained 30 pounds in preparation for his role. Other major supporting roles in Fargo second season include: Bruce Campbell as Ronald Reagan, Keir O'Donnell as Ben Schmidt, and Elizabeth Marvel as Constance Heck.

Filming

Preliminary scouting was well underway by the time Fargo was renewed. Principal photography began in Calgary, Alberta on January 19, 2015, and took 85 days. The city's central business district and Kensington neighborhood doubled for Kansas City, Sioux Falls, and Luverne. Production crew constructed the Waffle Hut set on the CL Ranch in neighboring Springbank. Elsewhere in the area, shooting took place in Didsbury, High River, Fort Macleod, and St. Mary's University. Initially, the weather posed a challenge for the production because it was too warm for snow. To solve this problem, the production crew brought snow to the set from nearby mountains.

Continuing his services from the prior season, Dana Gonzales oversaw production of the show's second season. The cinematographer took cues from William Eggleston to develop a retro visual palette. To achieve this quality, Gonzales relied on vintage practical lighting technology, and captured scenes with an Arri ALEXA camera, retrofitted with vintage Cooke lenses. In one section of Calgary where they were filming, production staff replaced each sodium-lamp street light with tungsten light bulbs, creating an ambience that "pulls the audience into the world when the story takes place". Also, once Hawley analyzed the 1968 thriller film The Boston Strangler, split screen effects were employed to help streamline the narrative during transitions. Gonzales said: "We felt that split-screen would be an incredible way to track all these characters and locations within the episode: Where's the Gerhardt family? Where are the guys from Kansas City? Where's Peggy? Where's Ed?"

Costume design
Costume designer Carol Case and Hawley worked closely together to develop Fargo costumes. Case saw the show as a big undertaking because of her desire to capture the "specific feeling" of 1970s fashion. Starting "from scratch", the design team sought to create a "really small-town America[n]" style for most of the show's wardrobe. They also felt that it was important to distinguish the style of the rural characters, who at that time were largely unaware of fashion trends, from that of the urban characters. For the urban characters, Case used clothes she bought from New York to create a more polished, sleek look. Though Fargo producers bought a few pieces months in advance of production, sourcing vintage wear proved to be daunting, especially for cold weather, since much of the available supply was inadequately insulated. As a consequence, many costumes, such as Dunst's, were either modified by adding insulation, or created anew by the design team. Some modern pieces were used for footwear and accessories.

Music
Leading music production of the second season of Fargo were composer Jeff Russo and newly appointed music supervisor Marguerite Phillips. Phillips was hired immediately after her first meeting with Hawley, in a text which she received as she left the building. Together, they brainstormed ideas on the season's musical direction; progressive rock, krautrock, Jethro Tull, and The Runaways were among several early suggestions. Phillips spent months conducting research, "dicking around and 'going down rabbit holes'" for the obscure music choices, until ultimately narrowing down the selection of music from a master playlist. Russo employed various compositional and recording techniques to build a distinctive retro sound. The soundtrack features songs by: Lisa Hannigan, Billy Thorpe "Children of the Sun", Burl Ives, Cris Williamson, Devo, Jeff Wayne, Yamasuki, Blitzen Trapper, Shakey Graves, White Denim, and Bobby Womack, as well as one cover version—Emmylou Harris, Alison Krauss and Gillian Welch's "Didn't Leave Nobody but the Baby" performed by Hawley. The use of "War Pigs" by Black Sabbath in the opening scenes of the season finale received acclaim. Russo also recorded music with the University of Southern California (USC) marching band at Hawley's request.

Reception

Ratings
Fargo premiered to 1.59 million U.S. viewers; 609,000 were in the 18–49 demographic. Viewership was down by 40% after the series premiere, and 19% from the season one finale. From then on, ratings for the second season fell in the 1.13 to the 1.32 million range until the final episode, which peaked with 1.82 million viewers.

Reviews
Fargo was considered among the best television shows of 2015 by the American press.  The season also holds the rare distinction of having each episode maintain a perfect 100% rating as well. Metacritic gives the season a score of 96, based on 33 reviews, indicating "universal acclaim". It was the highest rated TV show of the year on the same site, as well as the 20th highest of all time.

Christopher Orr of The Atlantic called Fargo "smart, thrilling, imaginative television, in addition to being wicked funny", in which Hawley assumes greater narrative dimension and assurance in his vision. Matthew Gilbert from The Boston Globe identified the dialog, acting, cinematography, music, set design and directing as its most satisfying attributes. So too did The Hollywood Reporter Tim Goodman, who believed that said qualities "make a very riveting and entertaining dark comedy spectacle". Neil Genzlinger, writing for The New York Times, said that Fargo marries deadpan humor, violence, and "observational oddity" in a way unmatched by similar dramas. In his review for Variety, Brian Lowry believed that despite the show's brisk pace, Hawley nonetheless adds depth to his story. Dan Jardine of Slant Magazine agreed and thought that the narrative complexity is what distinguishes season two from Fargo freshman season. Rolling Stone Rob Sheffield felt that Fargo painted "a fascinating portrait of America at the crossroads". Alan Sepinwall said in his review for HitFix that the series captures its namesake film's most redeeming qualities while assuming a distinct identity, and The A.V. Club website felt that the series was "the rare cable drama that forgoes attenuated storytelling and moral ambiguity, and instead delivers episode after episode where a lot happens, and all of it matters".

The ensemble performances were frequently mentioned in the critiques. Lowry cited the cast as one of the show's strongest assets, and Robert Biano in USA Today wrote that Fargo cast was "with nary a false note". The Daily Telegraph critic Michael Hogan singled out Dunst, Danson and Wilson for their work on the show, as did the San Francisco Chronicle David Wiegand, whose opinion was that many of the performers' signature roles enhanced Hawley's script. Matt Zoller Seitz of New York magazine found Wilson to be the stand out among a pool of actors that "deserve their own stand-alone appreciations". He said of the actor's performance: "He's a young man, and he's in good shape, but he carries himself like an older, heavier one, as if weighed down by burdens he hasn't fully acknowledged because he's not ready yet. You get a sense of a personality, perhaps a soul, in the process of evolving." Reviews from Entertainment Weekly and The Washington Post singled out Donovan, Smart, Milioti, Garrett, and Offerman for their acting. Grantland, The New York Observer, and the Los Angeles Times also praised the ensemble performances.

Accolades

Fargo was a candidate for a variety of awards, most of them recognizing outstanding achievement in writing, cinematography, directing, acting, and special effects. The series received eighteen Emmy nominations for the 68th Primetime Emmy Awards ceremony. It was named Television Program of the Year by the American Film Institute, and received three Golden Globe nominations—including for Best Actor and Best Actress in a Miniseries or Television Film (Wilson and Dunst respectively). Other accolades included two Satellite Awards nominations in two categories, two TCA Award nominations in two categories, and one Empire Award nomination. At the 6th Critics' Choice Television Awards, Fargo won four awards from eight nominations, the majority of which acknowledged the performance work of the show's cast.

Home media release
On February 23, 2016, 20th Century Fox released the second season of Fargo on DVD and Blu-ray formats in region 1. In addition to all ten episodes, both DVD and Blu-ray disc formats include five featurettes; "Lou on Lou: A Conversation with Patrick Wilson, Keith Carradine and Noah Hawley", "Waffles and Bullet Holes: A Return to Sioux Falls", "The Films of Ronald Reagan: Extended Fargo cut", "The True History of Crime in the Midwest", and "Skip Sprang TV Commercial".

References

External links
 
 

Television series set in 1979
2015 American television seasons
Cultural depictions of Ronald Reagan
Alien visitations in fiction